Shurak-e Bala (also Romanized as Shūrak-e Bālā; also known as Shūrak, Shūrek, and Shūrīk) is a village in Golestan Rural District, in the Central District of Jajrom County, North Khorasan Province, Iran. At the 2006 census, its population was 179, in 47 families.

References 

Populated places in Jajrom County